The 1945 VPI Gobblers football team represented Virginia Polytechnic Institute in the 1945 college football season.  The team was led by their head coach Herbert McEver and finished with a record of two wins and six losses (2–6).

Schedule

Players
The following players were members of the 1945 football team.

References

VPI
Virginia Tech Hokies football seasons
VPI Gobblers football